Diocese of Chicago may refer to:

Catholic
 Roman Catholic Archdiocese of Chicago
 St. Thomas Syro-Malabar Catholic Diocese of Chicago
 Ukrainian Catholic Eparchy of Chicago

Orthodox
 Diocese of Chicago and Mid-America (ROCOR)
 Metropolis of Chicago (Patriarchate of Constantinople)
 Orthodox Church in America Diocese of the Midwest (cathedra in Chicago)

Anglican
Episcopal Diocese of Chicago

Lutheran
Metropolitan Chicago Synod